Oriental Evil is a 1951 American drama film directed and produced by George Breakston and starring Martha Hyer and Tetsu Nakamura.

Plot
Sheryl Banning, an American woman, has come to Tokyo to seek information on why her brother killed himself. She hopes to find his former business partner, Thomas Putnam, to gain some kind of understanding or explanation.

In the meantime, Roger Mansfield, a British businessman, marries a Japanese girl who is pregnant with his child. Roger one day encounters Sheryl and, after listening to her, volunteers to use his contacts in the city to help her locate Putnam if he can. Roger expresses his desire for Sheryl, who is unaware that he has a wife.

A blackmailer turns up wanting money from Roger, threatening to reveal that he and Putnam are one and the same. Sheryl overhears him being called "Tom" and suspects the truth. Roger goes on a rampage, beating his wife, causing her to lose the baby and driving her to suicide. Roger burns down the house and flees, but, when caught, falls on his own knife.

Cast
 Martha Hyer as Sheryl
 Byron Michie as Roger
 Tetsu Nakamura as Noritomu Moriaji

References

External links
 
 
 http://orientalevil.pro

1951 films
Films shot in Japan
1951 drama films
American black-and-white films
Films produced by George Breakston
Films directed by George Breakston
Films scored by Albert Glasser
Films set in Japan
Japan in non-Japanese culture
American drama films
1950s English-language films
1950s American films